The Southside Flyers are a professional women's basketball team competing in the Women's National Basketball League (WNBL). The club is based in Dandenong, Melbourne, Victoria. The team was founded as the Dandenong Rangers, however before the 2019–20 WNBL season began the team was rebranded to the Southside Flyers, adopting a new logo, colour scheme and nickname. The team also transitioned owners at this time.

Historically, they have been one of the more successful franchises in league history, regularly making the playoffs, but have struggled over the past 2 years to make the grand final, falling short in the preliminary final stage. They are strong rivals with the cross-town Melbourne Boomers. The franchise has been home to notable players such as Penny Taylor, Jessica Bibby, Emily McInerny, Jacinta Hamilton, Jenna O'Hea, Kathleen MacLeod and Liz Cambage.

History 
Historically one of the better teams in the league, the Rangers have appeared in the Grand Final five times: winning in 2003–04 against the Sydney Uni Flames 65–53, 2004–05 also against the Flames 52–47 and 2011/12 against the Bulleen Boomers 94–70. They lost the 1992 Grand Final against the Perth Breakers 58–54 and in 2005–06 against the Canberra Capitals 68–55.

On 31 July 2019, it was announced the Rangers would undergo an entire rebrand to become Southside Flyers for the 2019–20 WNBL season. The Flyers will replace the classic bottle green and gold identity of the Rangers, with a colour scheme of aqua, navy blue, cyan blue and white expected to feature.

At this time the team, previously owned by the Dandenong Basketball Association, was purchased by Gerry Ryan, the owner of the team's long-time major sponsor Jayco Australia.

The Dandenong Rangers was founded before the date stated, the original stadium was at the old Dandenong markets before the Dandenong basketball complex was built, the rangers has been the representative team for the area since the 1980s the team competed in the state representative league before being adopted into the WNBL

Season-by-season records

Source: Dandenong Rangers

Players

Current roster

Former players 
  Penny Taylor
  Jessica Bibby
  Emily McInerny
  Jacinta Hamilton
  Kathleen MacLeod
  Liz Cambage
  Louella Tomlinson
  Aimie Clydesdale
  Leilani Mitchell
  Stephanie Reid
  Mercedes Russell
  Anneli Maley

See also

 Dandenong Rangers
 Melbourne Boomers
 Women's National Basketball League

References

External links
 Official WNBL website
 Official WNBL club website
 Dandenong Rangers official website

Basketball teams in Melbourne
 
Women's National Basketball League teams
Basketball teams established in 1992
1992 establishments in Australia
Sport in the City of Greater Dandenong